The Diamond Hero is an Austrian helicopter unmanned aerial vehicle under development by Diamond Aircraft Industries and introduced at the Aero show held in Friedrichshafen in April 2012. The aircraft builds on Diamond's experience building airborne sensor systems based on the Diamond DA42.

Design and development
The aircraft was designed to be an autonomous UAV that incorporates artificial intelligence and will be able to exercise its own flight judgment. For instance, in the event of an engine failure, the aircraft will be able to examine the terrain below it and pick the best location for an autorotational landing. Diamond Aircraft CEO Christian Dries said of the aircraft on 19 April 2012, "it's a little bit beyond a regular unmanned aircraft."

The aircraft is powered by two Austro Engine AE55 rotary engines and will be able to lift a  sensor payload for 6.5 hours of flight endurance or four hours of hover endurance. It also has a recovery parachute.

Specifications (Hero)

References

External links

Interview with Diamond Aircraft CEO Christian Dries about the Hero project

Unmanned aerial vehicles of Austria
Wankel-engined helicopters
Diamond aircraft
Unmanned helicopters
Proposed aircraft of Austria
Aircraft first flown in 2012